The 1932 LFF Lyga was the 11th season of the LFF Lyga football competition in Lithuania.  It was contested by 8 teams, and LFLS Kaunas won the championship.

League standings

Playoff
LFLS Kaunas 6-1 KSS Klaipėda

References
RSSSF

LFF Lyga seasons
Lith
Lith
1